The 1970 Cork Junior Football Championship was the 72nd staging of the Cork Junior A Football Championship since its establishment by Cork County Board in 1895. The championship ran from 11 October to 13 December 1970.

The final was played on 13 December 1970 at the Castle Grounds in Macroom, between Newmarket and Adrigole, in what was their first ever meeting in the final. Newmarket won the match by 1-09 to 2-04 to claim their first ever championship title.

Qualification

Results

Quarter-finals

Semi-finals

Final

References

1970 in Irish sport
Cork Junior Football Championship